Rekords Rekords is a record label formed by Josh Homme. It emerged in the aftermath of the downfall of Man's Ruin Records, the record label formerly putting out Homme's project The Desert Sessions. The Desert Sessions, a compilation of collaborative songs that is released in volumes, has been released under the Rekords Rekords label subsequent to the label's formation.

Artists
Alain Johannes
The Desert Sessions
Eagles of Death Metal
Fatso Jetson
Likehell
Mondo Generator
Mini Mansions
Queens of the Stone Age

Notes

References 

American record labels
Vanity record labels
Alternative rock record labels